Portage la Prairie is a rural municipality in the province of Manitoba in Western Canada. It surrounds the city of Portage la Prairie, Manitoba's fifth-largest city. Also within the borders of the municipality are the Dakota Plains First Nation and most of the Long Plain First Nation Indian reserves.

Communities

 Bloom
 Curtis
 Delta Beach
 Edwin
 Fortier
 Fulton
 High Bluff
 Layland
 Longburn
 Macdonald
 Newton
 Oakland
 Oakville
 Poplar Point
 Rignold
 St. Ambroise
 Southport

Demographics 

References

External links
 Official website
 Map of Portage la Prairie R.M. at Statcan

Portage la Prairie